The 2008-09 Biathlon World Cup - World Cup 8 was the eighth event of the World Cup season and was held in Trondheim, Norway, from Thursday March 19 until Sunday March 22, 2009.

Schedule of events
The schedule of the event is below

Event summary

Men

Women

References 

Biathlon World Cup - World Cup 8, 2008-09
March 2009 sports events in Europe
Sports competitions in Trondheim
Biathlon competitions in Norway
2009 in Norwegian sport
21st century in Trondheim